Lampropeltis annulata, commonly known as the Mexican milk snake, is a non-venomous species of milk snake.

Geographic range
This reptile is native to the hot semi-arid regions of northeastern Mexico in Coahuila, Tamaulipas and Nuevo León, but it can be found as far north as the United States, in southwestern Texas.

Description 
The Mexican milk snake has distinct red, black and cream or yellow colored banding, which sometimes leads to it being called a coral snake mimic. Localities indicate cleaner creams to the west, dirty creams to the east and north, and said creams turning yellow becoming orange the more south. The underside of annulata is checkered black and white in correlation to the overhead banding, with southern localities having higher concentrations of black and northern localities having more white. This subspecies can be differentiated from other milk snakes due to the darker light bands which display at the very lightest: a cream yellow color at the first light band following the black head (darker cream than other subspecies), with the rest of the light banding being solid cream. The very darkest light bands will display: a bright yellow or orange-yellow color following the first light band adjacent to the black head, with the rest of the light banding being a lighter hue of either yellow, cream-yellow, or orange-yellow. Other milk snake subspecies may have darker light banding depending on the individual snake, however, and as described, the Mexican milk snake has a much higher prevalence of this trait, along with other distinctive features. The light bands are typically considerably larger than the black bands, and broaden/widen towards the lower sides and ventral scales from the dorsal scales. Additional distinguishing features include all localities having red bands which are especially dark and crisp compared to other subspecies, with the red being around two or three times as wide as the black bands, and the red extending from the sides to the very edge of the ventral scales. The Mexican milk snake is fairly short in length and large in width compared to other milk snake subspecies, given that they grow to approximately 24–30 inches (61–76 cm) in length, and that they have more girth overall. It is not venomous, contrary to the coral snake which appears fairly similar to this milk snake. The coral snake's red and yellow bands are adjacent, while the milk snake's red and black bands are adjacent. Distinguishing between the two, therefore, is often taught with the mnemonic device "red touches/on black, friend of Jack; red touches/on yellow, kill a fellow" (a variation is: "Red on yellow kill a fellow. Red on black venom lack.").

Behavior 
Mexican milk snakes are generally nocturnal as well as crepuscular, and prefer to hide when the temperatures are higher, becoming most active in the cooler periods of the spring and fall. They eat primarily rodents and lizards, yet will occasionally eat other snakes. As with all Lampropeltis genus snakes, however, they will eat most if not all appropriately (or reasonably) sized animals they encounter if voracious enough. Their choice of habitat is semi-arid brush areas, with sandy soils. While these snakes are primarily nocturnal and crepuscular as stated, they will occasionally bask for short periods during the day, and in captivity, if provided with a basking lamp.

Breeding occurs on rainy spring evenings, and approximately 50 days later, the female will lay 4–10 eggs which will incubate for 55–60 days before hatching. Newborns are around 6–7 inches (15–17 cm) long.

In captivity 
The Mexican milk snake adapts well to captive care, and its smaller size and interesting coloration can make it an attractive choice for a pet snake. They are normally docile, and not typically apt to bite or expel musk.

References 

Lampropeltis
Reptiles of Mexico
Snakes of North America
Reptiles of the United States